Carmel Cacopardo (born 5 March 1956) is a Maltese politician and current leader of the AD+PD party.

Biography 
Carmel Cacopardo was born on 5 March 1956. He's married to Miriam and the couple have two children, Martina and Dario. He lives in Kalkara, Malta. He graduated from the University of Malta in Architecture and Civil Engineering in 1982 and in the University of Staffordshire in the United Kingdom in 2006 in the Sustainability and Environmental Management.

In 2006 Cacopardo published a book called Time For Radical Change, based on the research on the introduction of eco-contribution in Malta. He was a student at the University of Malta President of SDM (Maltese Democrat Students) and KSU President (of the University Students' Council).

On an international level, Cacopardo was the Vice chairman of EDS (European Democrat Students).

Politics 
Cacopardo was a member of the Nationalist Party. He contested in the general elections of 1987, 1992, 1996 under the PN ticket. For 12 years he was a member of the PN Executive Committee. He also occupied the posts of Information Secretary, Assistant Secretary-General and an Executive President of the Council of the PN. He was also a Secretary of MŻPN (The Youth Movement of PN).

Cacopardo quit being a member of the Nationalist Party in January 2008. He later joined Democratic Alternative.

In September 2017, Cacopardo became the leader of Democratic Alternative.

Books 

 Time for Radical Change, 2006

References 

1956 births
Living people
20th-century Maltese politicians
21st-century Maltese politicians
Nationalist Party (Malta) politicians
Democratic Alternative (Malta) politicians
University of Malta alumni
Alumni of Staffordshire University
Leaders of political parties in Malta